The roughscale sole (Clidoderma asperrimum) is an edible flatfish of the family Pleuronectidae. Its native habitat is the northern Pacific, from the coasts of China and Japan, across the Bering Sea to Alaska, Canada and the Californian coast of America.

Diet

The roughscale sole's diet consists of zoobenthos organisms such as marine invertebrates and fish.

References

roughscale sole
Fish of the North Pacific
roughscale sole